Adrasus or Adrasos was a town of ancient Cilicia, and in the later province of Isauria, inhabited in Roman and Byzantine times. It later became a bishopric; no longer the seat of a residential bishop, it remains a titular see of the Roman Catholic Church.

Its site is located near Balabolu, Asiatic Turkey.

References

Catholic titular sees in Asia
Populated places in ancient Cilicia
Populated places in ancient Isauria
Former populated places in Turkey
Roman towns and cities in Turkey
Populated places of the Byzantine Empire
History of Mersin Province